Best of is a 2007 album of Canadian singer Roch Voisine. It is a double album containing a collection of his best hits (in French and English) from the start of his career until 2007. It was released in 2 versions:

Canadian Version: 2 CDs (containing 2 new  releases) and 2 Bonus songs
European Version: 2 CDs (containing 2 new  releases) and 2 Bonus songs

Track listings

Canadian version

CD 1:
 "Garder le feu" (new version)
 "Hélène"
 "Pourtant"
 "Avant de partir"
 "L'Idole"
 "La Promesse"
 "Darlin'"
 "La Berceuse du petit diable"
 "Bye Bye"
 "Avec tes yeux Pretty Face"
 "Laisse-la rêver"
 "Miss caprice"
 "Un Simple Gars"
 "J'attends"
 "Tant pis"
 "Je te serai fidèle"
 "Obia"
 "Ne me laisse jamais partir" (new)

CD 2:
 "La légende Oochigeas"
 "Délivre-moi"
 "Jean Johnny Jean"
 "Hélène" (rock)
 "Kissing Rain"
 "Wind & Tears"
 "Shout Out Loud"
 "With These Eyes"
 "By Myself"
 "I'll Always Be There"

Bonus: 
 "Quelque part" (new version)
 Video: Exclusive interview with Roch Voisine about his career

European version
CD 1:
 "Garder le feu" (new)
 "Hélène"
 "Pourtant"
 "Avant de partir"
 "L'Idole"
 "La Promesse"
 "Darlin'"
 "La Berceuse du petit diable"
 "Bye bye"
 "Avec tes yeux Pretty face"
 "Laisse-la rêver"
 "Miss caprice"
 "Un simple gars"
 "Et si"
 "J'attends"
 "Tant pis"
 "Je te serai fidèle"
 "Le chemin" (New)

CD 2:
 "La légende Oochigeas"
 "Darlin'"
 "Délivre-moi"
 "Jean Johnny Jean"
 "Hélène" (rock)
 "Kissing Rain"
 "Wind & Tears"
 "Shout Out Loud"
 "Pretty Face"
 "With These Eyes"
 "By Myself"
 "I'll Always Be There"

Bonus:
 "Obia"
 "Je ne suis pas un héros"

External links
Roch Voisine Official site "Canadian album version" page
Roch Voisine Official site "European album version" page

2007 greatest hits albums
Roch Voisine albums